The Olympic Club Hotel is a historic hotel owned by McMenamins Pubs & Breweries in Centralia, Washington, United States. Built in 1908, it was originally known as the Oxford Hotel. After acquiring the property in 1997, McMenamins changed the name to reflect the new ownership. The hotel features 27 European-style guest rooms and a brewpub movie theater.

Notorious train robber Roy Gardner was re-captured at the then-Oxford Hotel after escaping federal custody in 1921.

The Olympic Club also hosts musical acts as part of the McMenamin chain's "Great Northwest Music Tour," mostly consisting of bands from the Portland, Oregon area.

References

Hotel buildings on the National Register of Historic Places in Washington (state)
Centralia, Washington
Buildings and structures in Lewis County, Washington
McMenamins
National Register of Historic Places in Lewis County, Washington